Finnmarkshallen is an indoor sports venue located in the town of Alta in Alta Municipality in Troms og Finnmark county, Norway. Opened in 1996, it is the home ground of the association football club Alta IF, that plays in the Norwegian Second Division. The hall is owned by the municipality, and has a seated capacity for 1,000 people. The venue has artificial turf.

References

External links
 Official site
 Finnmarkshallen - Nordic Stadiums

Alta, Norway
Football venues in Norway
Sports venues in Troms og Finnmark